Letchford is an English surname. Notable people with the surname include:

 Albert Letchford (1866–1905), English artist
 Chris Letchford (born 1984), American guitarist
 Maurice Letchford (1908–1965), Canadian sport wrestler

English-language surnames